In database theory, the Analytical Base Table (ABT) is a flat table that is used for building analytical models and scoring (predicting) the future behavior of a subject.

A single record in this table represents the subject of the prediction (e.g. a customer) and stores all data (variables) describing this subject.

Basically, there are two categories of data:  who is the subject (describing subject characteristics related to the organization, such as socio-demographic-geographic data, events, etc.), and what does the subject do (describing characteristics of subject behavior, product purchase, product usage, payment behavior, relationship instances, etc.).

ABT may be developed as a more general instance applicable to solving general business problems, but more often it is developed for solving very specific business problems.

Database theory